Apogon erythrinus, also called Hawaiian ruby cardinalfish, is a marine fish species endemic to Hawaii. It belongs to the family Apogonidae and the subfamily Apogoninae.

Description 
The Hawaiian ruby cardinalfish is a relatively small red fish with a somewhat transparent appearance. They can grow up to 1.57" (4 cm). They have a second dorsal fin spine that reaches at least to the base of the third ray of their second dorsal fin when depressed, and they have 14 pectoral fin rays. They usually get about 4 months old.

Distribution and habitat 
The Hawaiian ruby cardinalfish is endemic to the Hawaiian islands. These fish are very shy, nocturnal, and prefer to hide in and patrol along holes and crevices.

References 

Fish of Hawaii
Apogon

Wikipedia Student Program